Major General Trulan Arthur Eyre (born September 2, 1957) received his USAF regular commission in 1979 as a graduate of the United States Air Force Academy. He has served in numerous assignments in flying and operations, as well as command positions at squadron, group, and wing levels. He also served as the United States Air Force F-16 European Demonstration pilot and the deputy director of the Air Coordination and Control Element, US Embassy, Baghdad, Iraq. Eyre joined the Colorado Air National Guard in 1988 as a traditional member. He is a command pilot with over 4000 hours in the A-7, C-21, F-16, and T-38 including more than 100 combat hours. He is also the oldest active pilot flying the F-16 in any branch of the United States Military.

Eyre is the commander of the 140th Wing, Colorado Air National Guard, Buckley Air Force Base, Colorado. He is responsible for over 1500 personnel in support of F-16C+ (Air Combat Command) fighter and C-21 (Air Mobility Command) airlift aircraft missions, as well as 137th Space Warning Squadron (Air Force Space Command) and Civil Engineering (Pacific Air Forces) missions.

Achievements
 1984 Lead-In Fighter Training Top Gun and Distinguished Graduate
 1984 F-16 Replacement Training Unit Top Gun and Outstanding Graduate
 1986 496th Tactical Fighter Squadron Top Gun
 2000 140th Wing Top Gun

Assignments
 August 1979 – July 1980, student, Undergraduate Pilot Training, Williams Air Force Base, Arizona
 August 1980 – March 1981, student, T-38, Pilot Instructor Training, Randolph Air Force Base, Texas
 March 1981 – August 1982, instructor pilot, T-38, 97th Flying Training Squadron, Williams Air Force Base, Arizona
 August 1982 – September 1983, Standardization and Evaluation Flight Examiner, T-38, 82nd Flying Training Wing, Williams Air Force Base, Arizona
 October 1983 – January 1984, student, T-38, Lead-in-Fighter Training, Holloman Air Force Base, New Mexico
 February 1984 – October 1984, student, F-16, Replacement Training Unit, MacDill Air Force Base, Florida
 October 1984 – October 1988, F-16 pilot, instructor pilot, and Standardization and Evaluation Flight Examiner, 496th Tactical Fighter Squadron, Hahn Air Base, West Germany
 May 1987 – October 1988, United States Air Forces Europe F-16 Demonstration Pilot, Hahn Air Base, West Germany
 November 1988 – June 1996, A7/F-16 pilot, instructor pilot, and Standardization and Evaluation Flight Examiner, 120th Fighter Squadron, Buckley Air National Guard Base, Colorado
 June 1996 – June 1998, commander, D-Flight, 120th Fighter Squadron, Buckley Air National Guard Base, Colorado
 October 2000 – October 2003, commander, 140th Operations Support Squadron, Buckley Air Force Base, Colorado
 October 2003 – October 2006, commander, 140th Operations Group, Buckley Air Force Base, Colorado
 January 2006 – May 2006, deputy director, Air Control and Coordination Element, United States Embassy, Baghdad, Iraq
 October 2006 – May 2007, vice commander, 140th Wing, Buckley Air Force Base, Colorado
 May 2007–present – commander, 140th Wing, Buckley Air Force Base, Colorado

Major awards and decorations
 Legion of Merit
 Bronze Star Medal
 Meritorious Service Medal (with 3 Oak Leaf Clusters)
 Air Medal (with 1 Oak Leaf Cluster)
 Aerial Achievement Medal
 Air Force Commendation Medal
 Air Force Achievement Medal
 Air Force Outstanding Unit Award (with 'V' Device and 4 Oak Leaf Clusters)
 Combat Readiness Medal (with 2 Oak Leaf Clusters)
 National Defense Service Medal (with 1 Bronze Star)
 Armed Forces Expeditionary Medal
 Southwest Asia Service Medal (with 1 Bronze Star)
 Global War on Terrorism Expeditionary Medal
 Global War on Terrorism Service Medal
 Air Force Overseas Ribbon Long
 Air Force Longevity Service Ribbon (with 5 Oak Leaf Clusters )
 Armed Forces Reserve Medal (with 'M' Device and 1 Bronze Hourglass)
 Small Arms Expert Marksmanship Ribbon
 Air Force Training Ribbon
 Colorado Meritorious Service Medal
 Colorado Commendation Ribbon
 Colorado Active Service Medal (with 5 Bronze Stars)
 Colorado The Adjutant General Outstanding Unit Citation
 Colorado Long Service Medal
 Colorado State Emergency Service Ribbon
 Colorado Foreign Deployment Service Ribbon (with 5 Bronze Stars)
 Colorado State Mobilization Support Ribbon

Education
1979 United States Air Force Academy, Bachelor of Science, Civil Engineer, United States Air Force Academy, Colorado
1985 Tactical Leadership Programme, Jever Air Base, Germany
2002 Air War College, by correspondence.

Promotions
Second lieutenant 30 May 1979
First lieutenant 30 May 1981
Captain 30 May 1983
Major 8 August 1992
Lieutenant colonel 20 July 1997
Colonel 27 February 2004
Brigadier general 28 June 2007

Flying record
Rating: Command Pilot
Flight Hours: More than 4000
Aircraft Flown: A-7D/K Corsair II, C-21 Learjet, F-16A/B/C/D Falcon, T-37 Tweet, T-38 Talon

References

1957 births
Living people
United States Air Force generals
United States Air Force Academy alumni
Recipients of the Air Medal
Recipients of the Legion of Merit